John Henry Barrows (1847–1902) was an American clergyman of First Presbyterian Church and Chairman of the 1893 General Committee on the Congress of Religions (later to be known as the World's Parliament of Religions). He claimed that Abraham Lincoln had become a Christian in 1863.

Barrows is best known for organizing and leading World's Parliament of Religions in Chicago by bringing together renowned persons of different religious backgrounds from all over the world to increase interest in the studies of religions, clarify the misconceptions about varying religious traditions, and seemingly to show the supremacy of one religion over another. He is more credited for introducing a new concept of "tolerance" and "understanding" between all nations and religions through Parliament of Religions for Americans.

He authored several books and notably two volumes of The World's Parliament of Religions: An Illustrated and Popular Story of the World's First Parliament of Religions, Held in Chicago in Connection with the Columbian Exposition of 1893. An endowed chair at the University of Chicago Divinity School is named after him.

Biography

Early life and education 
Barrows was born in Medina Township, Michigan on July 11, 1847, to John Manning and Catherine Moore Barrows.

He received his Bachelor of Arts degree from Olivet College in 1867. He received his theological training from Yale Divinity School and Union Theological Seminary during 1867–1868 and 1868–1869 respectively. He became a member of Plymouth Church of the Pilgrims and was a student of pulpit oratory of Henry Ward Beecher, while at Union Theological Seminary.

For two and a half years, he did missionary and educational work in Kansas and preached for a year in the First Congregational Church – Springfield. He preached domestically and abroad for a while and graduated later from Andover Theological Seminary in 1875. He was then ordained to the Congregational ministry in 1875.

Marriage and family 
Barrows married Sarah Eleanor; together they had three daughters and a son.

He held pastorates from 1875 to 1881 at the Eliot Congregational Church in Lawrence, Massachusetts and Maverick Congregational Church of East Boston.

First Presbyterian Church pastor 
In 1881, he became the pastor of the First Presbyterian Church, which he held for fourteen years. During his stint as sixth pastor of Presbyterian Church, he became one of the most famous preachers of his time. He conducted Sunday evening service and spoke at temperance and missionary meetings. He was also a favourite speaker before gatherings at Chautauqua, New York and served on the advisory council of the Chautauquan System.

He went to India and the Orient – Japan and Honolulu – to give the Haskel Lecture through the Haskell Foundation (endowed by Caroline E. Haskell) in 1896 for the University of Chicago, which he continued lecturing for next two years. Barrows served as minister of the First Presbyterian Church in Chicago between 1886 and 1891.

Oberlin College president 
Barrows was elected as the president of Oberlin College in 1899, and under him the institution was said to be prospered greatly. He died in office on June 3, 1902.

Congress of Religions 
The World's Parliament of Religions was held in Chicago, Illinois, on the shore of Lake Michigan in 1893. Representatives of Protestantism, Hinduism, Jainism, Islam, Judaism, Catholicism, Greek and Russian Orthodoxy, Confucianism, Taoism, Shintoism, Ethical Culture, and others, met with objectives as mentioned in the 1891 Preliminary Address, including:
 To bring together representatives of religions from all around the world.
 To bring forth the truths the various religions teach in common.
 To promote the brotherhood among the religious men of diverse faith.

Charles Carroll Bonney, the president of the World's Congress Auxiliary and a layman in the Swedenborgian church, initiated the process of organizing the Parliament of Religions by appointing John Henry Barrows as chairman to administer the General Committee on World's Parliament of Religions. Under his leadership in June 1891, invitation copies in the thousands were sent to religious leaders around the world, reporting the plan for the Parliament of Religions scheduled to be held in 1893. However, the Presbyterian Church in the United States of America, the home church of Barrows, the then Sultan of Turkey, the European Roman Catholic hierarchy, the Archbishop of Canterbury, and many prominent evangelical leaders of North America such as Dwight L. Moody bitterly opposed the convention. Though there was no unanimous approval for the convention from Presbyterians, intense disapproval was worded in the letter of the Archbishop of Canterbury saying that "... the Christian religion is the one religion. I do not understand how that religion can be regarded as a member of a Parliament of Religions without assuming the equality of the other intended members and the parity of their position and claims." Though Max Müller, an Orientalist and Philologist, failed to attend the convention, yet he hoped the Parliament of Religions would increase the interest in the study of religions.

Despite varied encouragement and opposition, Parliament of Religions began on 11 September 1893. More than 4000 people gathered in the "Hall of Columbus," dominated predominantly by English-speaking Christian speakers along with limited representatives from other religious faiths – 12 speakers represented Buddhism; 11 speakers represented Judaism; 8 from Hinduism; 2 each from Islam, Parsi, Confucianism, and Shintoism; and 1 each from Taoism and Jainism. The convention continued for seventeen days with a variety of topics presented by a variety of speakers from various faiths and traditions. Most of the 17-day sessions were chaired and presided over by Barrows himself; Most of the times, he also performed the customary act of "silent prayer" and said the "Universal Prayer."

Observations 
Religion formed the essence of the convention in pushing aside the importance of culture and ethnicity. In the words of John P. Burris, "religion was perceived as the center of any given society and the most obvious aspect of culture through which the essence of a given people's cultural orientation might be understood." Hence, the decision to select the suitable religions to be part of the "Ten Great World Religions" through inclusion or exclusion pushed aside culture and ethnic contexts. Due to this, the Parliament included only converted African Americans by excluding Native Americans altogether.

The official objectives of the Parliament seem to have avoided an attitude of supremacy of one religion over another in the '1891 Preliminary Address'; nonetheless, much emphasis was laid in bringing forth the commonalities among the worldwide religions and thereby building "human brotherhood." In no case were there either attempts or aims for devising a "Universal Religion" or unity. It seems that the Parliament was able to introduce the importance of the comparative study of religions in order to maintain "mutual good understanding" among the various religious traditions as hoped by Max Müller.

According to Donald H. Bishop, there were three common attitudes towards other religions in the Parliament, namely, 'inclusivism', 'exclusivism', and 'pluralism'. To highlight these, Donald H. Bishop took illustrations from the speeches and views expressed by speakers in the convention; these are captured in both volumes of The World's Parliament of Religions: An Illustrated and Popular Story of the World's First Parliament of Religions, Held in Chicago in Connection with the Columbian Exposition of 1893, authored by Barrows.

 exclusivism: Bishop observes that exclusivist attitudes were either offensive or amicable in type. For this, he took the presentation made by William C. Wilkinson as an example:

 inclusivism: Donald H. Bishop defines inclusivism as an attitude towards other religions based on an underlying assumption that one's religion is superior to others, but this assumption is expressed through openness towards other religions. He means to say that the beliefs of other religions could be possibly included or subordinated to the terms defined by inclusivists with no effect on their own religious superiority. Once other religious beliefs become subordinated, they are longer 'threatening' to the superior religion and its beliefs.
 pluralism: Bishop observes that pluralism was expressed in the Parliament's emphasizing more the peaceful coexistence of religions by rejecting any claim to supremacy of one over other religion. He referred to Charles Carroll Bonney's opening speech to express the pluralistic attitude of the Parliament:

As reported in the article "World Parliament of Religions" (1893), the attitude towards plurality was evident in the invitations sent to all religious representatives worldwide:
	

In words of Barrows, " 'human progress' would objectively reach its culmination through Christianity. As the apex of all religions, Christianity can influence other religions meaningfully, but not vice versa."

Apparently, Barrows' aim for the World's Parliament of Religions's convention was to appreciate and welcome other religions and their beliefs with open heart, but subordinate them to the finality of Christianity. However, this seems, to have been threatened by the "Universal Religion and Universal religious truth," said to have been proposed by Swami Vivekananda.

As reported in the article, John H. Barrows continued with a Christian version of the Darwinian – survival of the fittest, which he also mentioned in his writings:

The efforts of Barrows and World's Parliament of Religions has visibly left significant legacies for America and its people. In the words of Joseph Kitagawa, "A strong stimulus for the wide acceptance of the study of comparative religion" in America emerged in academic life. While Marcus Braybrooke, President of the World Congress of Faiths, said that "other religions and faiths introduced to Americans other than Christianity has raised the awareness about 'religious plurality' among Americans." Diana L. Eck also sees the first World's Parliament of Religions as one of the first events of the ecumenical movement. It seems to have influenced Christian missionaries abroad and also religious figures from East – Swami Vivekanada, Anagarika Dharmapala, Protap Chunder Mozoomdar, and Soyen Shaku -, towards an appreciation of other religious traditions.

Some excerpts 
A letter preserves a speech of Anagarika Dharmapala, who was a Buddhist delegate from Ceylon – then a British colony. He was invited to represent "Southern Buddhism." A few excerpts from that speech:

Barrows had advertised in the Chinese newspapers proposing a premium in gold for the best essays on Confucianism and Taoism. This drew 42 Chinese scholars to enter the competition. The selected Chinese essay was translated into English and read on the fifth day, Friday, September 15, 1893. A Chinese by the name of 'Kung Hsien Ho' of Shanghai won the first prize.

Barrows, in the absence of representation of the Hindu creed, ensured a unique audience there after he had won the confidence of India's representatives as their host at Chicago. Being desirous to write on Hinduism, he wrote a letter to more than 100 prominent Hindu's requesting each to explicate some of the leading tenets of Hinduism according to their views. He received just one reply:

A letter was sent by 'S. Horiuchi', a Japanese and Secretary of the Society for the Restoration of Buddhist Holy Places in India:

Silent debate with Swami Vivekananda
Barrows invited Hindu monk Swami Vivekananda to make some remarks during the Parliament of Religion sessions; Vivekananda responded with a short fable to illustrate the variety of men of different races and religions, just before the close of the afternoon session on the fifth day, Friday, 15 September 1893.

As reported in Rediff.com, the Chicago Tribune listed Swami Vivekananda as being introduced in the afternoon session after a lunch recess; A news report titled "Common Cause" on the same day appeared in the Chicago Tribune and described the attire of Swami Vivekananda as a "single violent orange garment". The article written by 'Wesley Wildman' titled "World Parliament of Religions (1893)" states that Vivekananda's three speeches drew the most attention from the American public. It also states that Barrows recorded in his works that when Vivekananda addressed the audience as "Sisters and Brothers of America," he drew wide applause which lasted for several minutes.

Another article mentions about Barrows' comments on Vivekananda's influence in Parliament:

"World Parliament of Religions" (1893), written by Wesley Wildman, states that Barrows mentioned in his works Vivekananda's belief that "every religion is only an evolving of God out of the material man; and the same God is the inspirer of all of them." The article also states:

The article also mentions the interpretation of "Universal Religion" as:

Barrows, in his "Review and Summary" of the Parliament, seemed to attack Vivekananda's idea of "Universal Religion," having perceived it as a 'threat' to Christian supremacy. It seems,  Barrows expressed his concerns:

Eventually, Barrows supported the Christian version of Darwinian – "survival of the fittest," saying, as mentioned above:

There is also a quotation in an article about Barrows, in his History of the Parliament of Religions:

There are some interesting and contradicting facts about Swami Vivekananda's belief in Spirituality and Vegetarianism. As reported in an article written by 'Shashi Shekar' for Rediff.com, the author found some article clippings that appeared in The New York Times wherein Vivekananda debunked spirituality and vegetarianism, apparently during an event in New York City in May 1894, while speaking on vegetarianism to an audience.

There is another article from The Outlook; then, Vivekananda preferred "beef" as his food with Barrows. The article seems to have appeared on July 17, 1897:

There is also a contradictory report about Vivekananda's master Ramakrishna aka Ramakrishna Paramahansa, a mystic, for having learned or known Sanskrit as a language. There is a second-hand story  in The Outlook magazine, re-published in several articles. According to the reports, Barrows had learned an interesting story from Max Muller, professor at Oxford University about Sanskrit, where Max Muller had asked Swami Vivekananda if his master, Ramakrishna, knew Sanskrit.

Abraham Lincoln had become a Christian claim 
Barrows claimed that Abraham Lincoln had become a Christian without providing any evidence. In the Lincoln Memorial Album, following Lincoln's assassination, Barrows wrote a few comments about Lincoln's religion:

Bibliography 
 Seven Lectures on the Credibility of the Gospel Histories – 1891
 The World's Parliament of Religions: An Illustrated and Popular Story of the World's First Parliament of Religions, Held in Chicago in Connection with the Columbian Exposition of 1893. Vol. I
 The World's Parliament of Religions: An Illustrated and Popular Story of the World's First Parliament of Religions, Held in Chicago in Connection with the Columbian Exposition of 1893. Vol. II
 Henry Ward Beecher, the Shakespeare of the Pulpit – 1893
 A World Pilgrimage – 1897
 Christianity, the World Religion – 1897
 The Christian Conquest of Asia – 1899
 Spiritual Forces in American History  – 1889
 Christianity the World-Religion: Lectures Delivered in India and Japan
 I Believe in God the Father Almighty
 The Nation and the Soldier. a Memorial Address
 A World-Pilgrimage

See also 
 Abraham Lincoln and religion

References

External links 
 John Henry Barrows Professor of Islamic History and Literature in the Divinity School
 Sisters and Brothers of America – Swami Vivekananda's speech in Chicago at the Parliament of Religions
 The Parliament's Archives
 2. The World's Parliament of Religions 1893
 The International Social Turn: Unity and Brotherhood at the World's Parliament of Religions, Chicago, 1893
 Great American Events/Universalists – The World Parliament of Religions, 1893

American Christian clergy
Presidents of Oberlin College
1847 births
1902 deaths
Olivet College alumni
19th-century American clergy